DJ-Kicks: Four Tet is a DJ mix album released on the Studio !K7 independent record label.  Part of the DJ-Kicks series of mix compilations, it is the 27th installment of the series and was compiled and mixed by Four Tet.

Track listing
 David Behrman - "Leapday Night (Scene 1)"
 Syclops - "Mom, the Video Broke"
 Curtis Mayfield - "If I Were Only a Child Again"
 Heiner Stadler - "Out-Rock"
 Gary Davis - "The Professor's Here"
 Heldon - "Les soucoupes volantes vertes"
 Stereolab - "Les Yper-Sound"
 So Solid Crew - "Dilemma"
 Akufen - "Psychometry 3.2"
 Animal Collective - "Baby Day"
 Madvillain - "Figaro (101 Remix)"
 Julian Priester + Pepo Mtoto - "Love, Love"
 Four Tet - "Pockets"
 Model 500 - "Psychosomatic"
 Shona People of Rhodesia - "Taireva"
 Quickspace Supersport - "Superspace"
 Cabaret Voltaire - "Kneel to the Boss"
 Gong - "Love Is How Y Make It"
 Showbiz & AG - "Represent"
 Group Home - "Up Against the Wall (Getaway Car Mix)"
 Autechre - "Flutter"

References

 DJ-Kicks: Four Tet at the official !K7 website

Four Tet
Four Tet albums
2006 compilation albums